Sebastiano Zanetti is an Italian coxswain. He won a gold medal at the 1987 World Rowing Championships in Copenhagen with the lightweight men's eight.

References

Year of birth missing (living people)
Italian male rowers
World Rowing Championships medalists for Italy
Coxswains (rowing)
Living people